This is a list of Croatian television related events from 1984.

Events

Debuts

Television shows

Ending this year

Births
6 March - Iva Visković, actress
7 November - Lana Jurčević, singer & TV host

Deaths